Martin Carl Imhof (born October 9, 1949) is a former American football defensive end for the National Football League (NFL) for the St. Louis Cardinals, Washington Redskins, New England Patriots, and Denver Broncos.  He played college football at San Diego State University and was drafted in the fourth round of the 1972 NFL Draft.

References

External links
 

1949 births
Living people
American football defensive linemen
Arizona Cardinals players
Denver Broncos players
New England Patriots players
San Diego State Aztecs football players
Washington Redskins players